Samir Mammadov (born May 15, 1988) is a boxer from Azerbaijan, who won the silver medal in the men's flyweight division (– 51 kg) at the 2006 European Championships in Bulgaria and bronze at the 2007 World Championships.

Career
At the Euros 2006 he beat Vincenzo Picardi and Jérôme Thomas but lost to Georgi Balakshin.

At the Junior World Championships 2006 he competed as a bantamweight but lost to Uzbek Orzubek Shayimov.
 
At the 2007 World Amateur Boxing Championships he dropped to flyweight and beat the Puerto Rican PanAmerican Games Gold medalist McWilliams Arroyo to reach the semifinals, where he was defeated by Rau'shee Warren.

References
 Euro 2006
 Chicago results
sports-reference

Azerbaijani male boxers
Flyweight boxers
1988 births
Living people
Boxers at the 2008 Summer Olympics
Olympic boxers of Azerbaijan
AIBA World Boxing Championships medalists
20th-century Azerbaijani people
21st-century Azerbaijani people
Sportspeople from Baku